Ryanair  is an Irish ultra low-cost carrier founded in 1984. It is headquartered in Swords, Dublin, Ireland and has its primary operational bases at Dublin and London Stansted airports. It forms the largest part of the Ryanair Holdings family of airlines and has Ryanair UK, Buzz, Lauda Europe, and Malta Air as sister airlines. It is Ireland's biggest airline and in 2016 became Europe's largest budget airline by scheduled passengers flown, carrying more international passengers than any other airline.

Ryanair Group operates more than 400 Boeing 737-800 aircraft, with a single 737-700 used as a charter aircraft, as a backup, and for pilot training. The airline has been characterized by its rapid expansion, a result of the deregulation of the aviation industry in Europe in 1997 and the success of its low-cost business model. Ryanair's route network serves 40 countries in Europe, North Africa (Morocco), and the Middle East (Israel and Jordan).

The company has at times been criticised for its refusal to issue invoices for the VAT-exempt services it provides (airfares), poor working conditions, heavy use of extra charges, bad customer service, and tendency to intentionally generate controversy in order to gain free publicity.

History 
Since its establishment in 1984, Ryanair has grown from a small airline, flying the short journey from Waterford to London Gatwick, into Europe's largest carrier. There have been over 19,000 people working for the company, most employed and contracted by agencies to fly on Ryanair aircraft.

The airline went public in 1997, and the money raised was used to expand the airline into a pan-European carrier. Revenues have risen from €231 million in 1998 to €1,843 million in 2003 and to €3,013 million in 2010. Similarly, net profits have increased from €48 million to €339 million over the same period.

Early years 

Ryanair was founded in 1984 as "Danren Enterprises" by Christopher Ryan, Liam Lonergan (owner of Irish travel agent Club Travel), and Irish businessman Tony Ryan, founder of Guinness Peat Aviation. The airline was shortly renamed "Ryanair". It began operations in 1985 flying a 15-seat Embraer Bandeirante turboprop aircraft between Waterford and Gatwick Airport.

In 1986, the company added a second route–flying Dublin to Luton, thus directly competing with the Aer Lingus/British Airways duopoly for the first time. Under partial EEC deregulation, airlines could begin new international intra-EEC services, as long as one of the two governments approved (the so-called "double-disapproval" regime). The Irish government at the time refused its approval to protect Aer Lingus, but Britain—under Margaret Thatcher's deregulating Conservative government—approved the service. With two routes and two aircraft, the fledgling airline carried 82,000 passengers in one year.

In 1986, the directors of Ryanair took an 85% stake in London European Airways. From 1987, this provided a connection with the Luton Ryanair service onward to Amsterdam and Brussels. In 1988, London European operated as Ryanair Europe and later began to operate charter services. That same year, Michael O'Leary joined the company as chief financial officer. In 1989, a Short Sandringham was operated with Ryanair sponsorship titles but never flew revenue-generating services for the airline.

Due to decreasing profits, the company restructured in 1990, copying the low-fares model of Southwest Airlines, after O'Leary visited the company.

1992–2009 

In 1992, the European Union's deregulation of the air industry in Europe gave carriers from one EU country the right to operate scheduled services between other EU states and represented a major opportunity for Ryanair. After a successful flotation on the Dublin and the NASDAQ stock exchanges, the airline launched services to Stockholm, Sandefjord Airport, Torp (110 km south of Oslo), Beauvais–Tillé northwest of Paris, and Charleroi near Brussels. In 1998, flush with new capital, the airline placed a massive US$2 billion order for 45 new Boeing 737-800 series aircraft.

The airline launched its website in 2000, with online booking initially said to be a small and unimportant part of the software supporting the site. Increasingly online booking contributed to the aim of cutting flight prices by selling directly to passengers and excluding the costs imposed by travel agents. Within a year, the website was handling three-quarters of all bookings.

Ryanair launched a new base of operation in Charleroi Airport in 2001. Later that year, the airline ordered 155 new 737-800 aircraft from Boeing at what was believed to be a substantial discount, to be delivered over eight years from 2002 to 2010. Approximately 100 of these aircraft had been delivered by the end of 2005, although there were slight delays in late 2005 caused by production disruptions arising from a Boeing machinists' strike.

In April 2003, Ryanair acquired its ailing competitor Buzz from KLM.

During 2004, Michael O'Leary warned of a "bloodbath" during the winter from which only two or three low-cost airlines would emerge, the expectation is that these would be Ryanair and EasyJet. A loss of €3.3 million in the second quarter of 2004 was the airline's first recorded loss for 15 years but the airline became profitable soon after. The enlargement of the European Union on 1 May 2004 opened the way to more new routes for Ryanair.

The rapid addition of new routes and new bases has enabled growth in passenger numbers and made Ryanair among the largest carriers on European routes. In August 2005, the airline claimed to have carried 20% more passengers within Europe than British Airways.

For the six months ending on 30 September 2006, passenger traffic grew by more than a fifth to 22.1 million passengers and revenues rose by a third to €1.256 billion.

On 13 February 2006, Britain's Channel 4 broadcast a documentary as part of its Dispatches series, "Ryanair caught napping". The documentary criticised Ryanair's training policies, security procedures and aircraft hygiene, and highlighted poor staff morale. Ryanair denied the allegations and claimed that promotional materials, in particular a photograph of a stewardess sleeping, had been faked by Dispatches.

On 5 October 2006, Ryanair launched a €1.48 billion (£1 billion; $1.9 billion) bid to buy fellow Irish flag carrier Aer Lingus. On 2 October 2006, Aer Lingus rejected Ryanair's takeover bid, saying it was contradictory.

In August 2006, the company started charging passengers to check in at the airport, therefore reversing its policy of paying for online check-in. It says that cutting airport check-in reduces overhead costs.

Ryanair's CEO, Michael O'Leary, stated in April 2007 that Ryanair planned to launch a new long-haul airline around 2009. The new airline would be separate from Ryanair and operate under different branding. It would offer both low costs with fares starting at €10.00 and a business class service which would be much more expensive, intended to rival airlines like Virgin Atlantic. The new airline would operate from Ryanair's existing bases in Europe to approximately six new bases in the United States. The new American bases will not be main bases such as New York's JFK airport, but smaller airports located outside major cities. Since the Boeing 787 was sold out of production until at least 2012, and the Airbus A350 XWB will not enter service until 2014, this has contributed to a delay in the airline's launch. It is said that the name of the new airline will be RyanAtlantic and it will sell tickets through the Ryanair website under an alliance agreement. In February 2010, O'Leary said the launch would be delayed until 2014, at the earliest, because of the shortage of suitable, cheap aircraft.

In October 2008, Ryanair withdrew operations from a base in Europe for the first time when it closed its base in Valencia, Spain. Ryanair estimated the closure cost 750 jobs.

On 1 December 2008, Ryanair launched a second takeover bid of Aer Lingus, offering an all-cash offer of €748 million (£619 mils; US$950 million). The offer was a 28% premium on the value of Aer Lingus stock, during the preceding 30 days. Ryanair said, "Aer Lingus, as a small, stand-alone, regional airline, has been marginalised and bypassed, as most other EU flag carriers consolidate." The two airlines would operate separately. Ryanair stated it would double the Aer Lingus short-haul fleet from 33 to 66 and create 1,000 new jobs. The Aer Lingus board rejected the offer and advised its shareholders to take no action. On 22 January 2009, Ryanair walked away from the Aer Lingus takeover bid after it was rejected by the Irish government on the grounds it undervalued the airline and would harm competition. However, Ryanair retained a stake in Aer Lingus; in October 2010, competition regulators in the UK opened an inquiry, due to concerns that Ryanair's stake may lead to a reduction in competition.

In 2009, Ryanair announced that it was in talks with Boeing and Airbus about an order that could include up to 200 aircraft. Even though Ryanair had dealt with Boeing aircraft up to that point, Michael O'Leary said he would buy Airbus aircraft if it offered a better deal. Airbus Chief Commercial Officer John Leahy denied in February 2009 that any negotiations were taking place.

On 21 February 2009, Ryanair confirmed it was planning to close all check-in desks by the start of 2010. Michael O'Leary, Ryanair's chief executive, said passengers would be able to leave their luggage at a bag drop, but everything else would be done online. This became reality in October 2009.

In June 2009, Ryanair reported its first annual loss, with a loss posted of €169 million for the financial year ending 31 March.

In November 2009, Ryanair announced that negotiations with Boeing had proceeded poorly and that Ryanair was thinking of stopping the negotiations, then putting at 200 aircraft for delivery between 2013 and 2016, and simply returning cash to shareholders. Boeing's competitor Airbus was mentioned again as an alternative vendor for Ryanair, but both Michael O'Leary and Airbus CCO John Leahy dismissed this. In December 2009, Ryanair confirmed that negotiations with Boeing had indeed failed. Plans were to take all 112 aircraft already on order at that point, with the last deliveries occurring in 2012, for a total fleet of over 300. Ryanair confirmed that an agreement had been met on price, but it had failed to agree on conditions, as Ryanair had wanted to carry forward certain conditions from its previous contract.

2010s 

In April 2010, after a week of flight disruption in Europe caused by the 2010 eruptions of Eyjafjallajökull in Iceland, Ryanair decided to end refusals to comply with EU regulations which stated it was obliged to reimburse stranded passengers. In a company statement released on 22 April 2010, Ryanair described the regulations as 'unfair'. On 29 April 2010, Ryanair cancelled all of its routes from Budapest Liszt Ferenc Airport after talks with the airport's management on reducing fees failed. As the airport is the only one serving Budapest, there is no lower-cost airport nearby. In June 2010, Ryanair called for the Irish government to scrap its tourist tax, implying it was destroying tourism in Ireland. In August 2010, Ryanair held a press conference in Plovdiv and announced its first-ever Bulgarian destination connecting Plovdiv with London Stansted. The service was planned to start in November 2010 with two flights weekly. In late 2010, Ryanair began withdrawing all routes from its smallest base, Belfast City, and Shannon due to increased airport fees.

In the last three months of 2010, Ryanair made a loss of €10.3 million, compared with a loss of €10.9 million in the same period the previous year. More than 3,000 flights were cancelled in the quarter. Ryanair blamed the losses on strikes and flight cancellations due to severe weather.

In March 2011, Ryanair opened a new maintenance hangar at Glasgow Prestwick International Airport, making it Ryanair's biggest fleet maintenance base. In June 2011, Ryanair and COMAC signed an agreement to cooperate on the development of the C-919, a Boeing 737 competitor.

Ryanair cut capacity by grounding 80 aircraft between November 2011 and April 2012 due to the high cost of fuel and continuing weak economic conditions.

On 19 June 2012, Ryanair Chief Executive Michael O'Leary announced his intention to make an all-cash offer for Aer Lingus. The bid was blocked by the European Commission in 2017, which had also blocked an earlier bid.

According to research in October 2013, Ryanair was the cheapest low-cost airline in Europe in basic price (excluding fees) but was the fourth cheapest when fees were included.

On 25 October 2013, Ryanair announced what it described as a series of "customer service improvements", to take place over the next six months. These included lower fees for reprinting boarding passes, free changes of minor errors on bookings within 24 hours, and a free second small carry-on bag. Ryanair said it was making the changes as a result of customer feedback.

On 27 January 2014, Ryanair moved into a new €20m, 100,000 sq ft Dublin head office in Airside Business Park, having outgrown its previous office within Dublin Airport. The building was officially opened on Thursday 3 April 2014 by the then Taoiseach Enda Kenny, Minister for Finance Michael Noonan and the Lord Mayor of Dublin Oisin Quinn.

On 8 September 2014, Ryanair agreed to purchase up to 200 Boeing 737 MAX 8s (100 confirmed and 100 options) for over $22 billion.

The airline confirmed plans to open an operating base at Milan Malpensa Airport in December 2015, initially with one aircraft.

On 9 March 2016, Ryanair launched a corporate jet charter service, offering a Boeing 737-700 for corporate or group hire.

In November 2016, Ryanair launched a new package holiday service named Ryanair Holidays. The new service offers flights, accommodation, and transfer packages. The service was launched in Ireland, the United Kingdom and Germany, with other markets to follow. Ryanair partnered with Spain-based tour operator, Logitravel, and accommodation provider, World2Meet, to create Ryanair Holidays.

In April 2017, Ryanair started issuing tickets for connecting flights, meaning if a connection is missed, the customer will be rebooked at no extra cost and compensated according to the EU Flight Compensation Regulation. To begin with, such tickets were only sold for flights with connections at Rome-Fiumicino airport.

In 2017, the company announced plans to add 50 new aircraft to its fleet every year for the next five years, aiming to reach 160 million passengers by the early 2020s, up from 120 million passengers.

Abandoning the single-airline strategy 
For over a decade, Ryanair had only operated with its Irish Air Operator's Certificate and solely under the Ryanair brand. However, starting in 2018 the airline began introducing additional brands and operating on multiple certificates in different countries.

In 2017, Ryanair announced that it would launch an independent Polish subsidiary in 2018, operating charter flights from Poland to Mediterranean destinations. Aside from turning away from the company's policy of only operating on a single Air Operator's Certificate, the step also meant that Ryanair would be launching charter flights after having focused only on scheduled operations before. The subsidiary was branded Ryanair Sun and received its Polish Air Operator's Certificate in April 2018 and subsequently launched Initially, it had only one former Ryanair Boeing 737-800 and complemented its operation with wet-leased aircraft from its mother company. In late 2018, Ryanair Sun was expanded by transferring all Polish-based Ryanair aircraft to it. The decision was made in the wake of staff costs and unions. As a consequence, Ryanair Sun mainly operated scheduled flights on behalf of its mother company using Ryanair's FR flight numbers.

Also in 2018, Ryanair expanded its portfolio with Austrian-based Laudamotion, later renamed "Lauda". Laudamotion was the successor of Niki, which had folded as a consequence of the Air Berlin demise. The company was founded by Niki Lauda. Initially, Ryanair purchased a 25-per cent share in Laudamotion to increase the share to 75 per cent pending government approval. The deal was announced in March 2018 ahead of the carrier's launch in June 2018. After increasing its share to 75 per cent, Ryanair fully acquired the Austrian airline in December 2018.

On 28 September 2018, pilots, cabin crew and other staff called for a strike due to the transition from workers being employed on Irish contracts and subject to Irish legislation to their own countries' labour laws, along with an issue in their pay. Due to the lobbying of the crew and walk-outs of pilots, the airline had to cancel 250 flights, which affected around 40,000 passengers.

On 9 June 2019, Ryanair announced (together with the Government of Malta), that it would establish a new airline called Malta Air (not to be confused with Air Malta), which will consist of an initial fleet of ten aircraft and assume the 61 flights currently operated by Ryanair from the island. The fleet was registered in Malta while a new repair and maintenance hangar was also set up. Ryanair transferred all its existing Maltese operations to the new airline and its fleet was expected to increase from the six Boeing 737-800 aircraft currently allocated to the Malta market to ten (all to be in Malta Air colours) by mid-2020.

2020s 

The carrier's CEO made comments at the A4E Aviation Summit in Brussels on 3 March 2020. Michael O'Leary said that he expected people to get 'bored' of the COVID-19 pandemic and saw a recovery by the summer of 2020. That changed, with Ryanair announcing in a statement that it expected demand to return to 2019 levels by the summer of 2022.

The COVID-19 pandemic has had a significant impact on Ryanair. While the CEO, Michael O'Leary, remains adamant that state aid is not an option, the carrier has announced several changes to its operations. This includes the loss of 3000 jobs, announced on 1 May 2020, which will affect mainly pilots and cabin crew. This comes as the airline announced it would suspend the majority of its operations until June 2020. In July 2020, Ryanair's CEO, Michael O'Leary announced that the company had made a net loss of €185 million in the period April–June 2020. In comparison, in the same period last year, the firm made a net profit of €243 million. In September 2020, the airline threatened to leave Ireland due to COVID-19 restrictions. Despite their original plan, to fly 60% of the previous year's schedule, in October 2020, the company decided to reduce the number of flights between the period of November 2020–March 2021 to 40%. According to O'Leary, this was a result of "government mismanagement of EU air travel" as the quarantine travel measures were loosened. By the end of December 2020, the airline reported an 83% drop in annual passengers, from 2019.

Due to the persisting COVID-19 pandemic, Ryanair is expecting losses of between €800m and €850m in their fiscal year of 2021. Only 27.5 million passengers flew compared to 148.6 million passengers in the previous financial year. The full financial report was released on 17 May 2021. The company reported a record annual loss of $989 million.

Corporate affairs

Business trends 
The key trends for the Ryanair Group over recent years are (as of the year ending 31 March):

Head office 

The head office of Ryanair has been in the Airside Business Park in Swords, County Dublin, Ireland since 2014. David Daly, a developer, had built the facility before Ryanair's 2012 purchase. The building has  of space, and the airline paid €11 million to occupy the building. According to John Mulligan of the Irish Independent, it was thought that Ryanair would refurbish the building for another €9 million. Previously, since 2004, the head office had been on the property of Dublin Airport, in proximity to the Aer Lingus head office. Darley Investments built the facility in 1992. Ryanair later purchased Darley and had a 30-year lease of the head office facility from the Department of Transport of Ireland. For twelve years, the company paid no rent even though it was supposed to pay €244,000 per year. After twelve years and before 2008, it paid less than half of the €244,000.

Criticism

Invoicing 
Ryanair clearly states on its website that it doesn't issue invoices since VAT doesn't apply to air fares. This is an apparent paradox to the revenue law fact that VAT-exempt services should be registered through invoicing when the customer requires or needs so.  Attempts at enforcing tax legislation have proven unsuccessful both in Ireland, where the company is headquartered and through other European fiscal authorities.

Employment relations

Refusal to recognise unions 
In the early years, when Ryanair had a total of 450 employees who each had shares in the company, there was an agreement that staff would not join a labour union on the basis that they would influence how the company was run. The treatment of employees has changed considerably since then and new employees no longer get shares in the company. Whilst Ryanair announced in December 2017 that it would recognise pilots' unions, the company still refuses to recognise or negotiate with any union for cabin crew.

In 2011, a former Ryanair captain was awarded financial compensation by an employment tribunal in London after being fired for handing out a union form to a cabin crew member while on duty.

In 2012, the Ryanair Pilot Group (RPG) was formed, but to date has not been successful in its aim to represent the pilots flying for Ryanair as a collective bargaining unit.

Thousands of flights cancellations on 15 September 2017 triggered pilots to mobilise, and on 15 December, in Italy, Ireland and Portugal, O‘Leary recognised unions for the first time, blaming their good timing; he anticipated an uptick in labour costs in 2018, not altering its model. Ryanair discussed union recognition in response to threatened strikes over the Christmas period.

Employment conditions 
Ryanair faced criticism for allegedly forcing pilots to pay tens of thousands of euros for training, then establish limited companies in Ireland to have the pilots work for Ryanair through an agency, as well as forcing ground staff in Spain to open bank accounts in Gibraltar in which to receive their wages.

In May 2014, Ryanair's office in Marseille was raided by French police investigating complaints that the company was failing to follow French employment law. Ryanair protested about the raid.

In May 2015, the Mayor of Copenhagen announced a boycott of Ryanair. This came in the wake of protests from Danish unions regarding employment conditions. After a court trial confirmed the unions' right to strike, Ryanair moved its bases out of Denmark.

On 10 August 2018, pilots of Ryanair in Germany, Sweden, Ireland, Belgium and the Netherlands walked out for 24 hours, leaving 400 flights cancelled. It is considered to be one of the biggest strikes over pay issues.

On 26 September 2018, Ryanair was forced to cancel 150 flights scheduled for that day, accounting for roughly 6% of its total flights, due to strikes in Spain, Belgium, the Netherlands, Portugal, Italy, and Germany. The British Civil Aviation Authority (CAA) urged the company to compensate the 2,400 affected passengers under EU Regulation 261, but Ryanair stated that it would refuse to accept any claims for compensation. In December 2018, the Civil Aviation Authority announced that it would be taking legal action against Ryanair over its refusal to compensate thousands of UK-based customers. In April 2021, the High Court rejected Ryanair's claim that it was exempt from awarding compensation because the disruption was due to "extraordinary circumstances". The ruling was upheld by the Court of Appeal in February 2022, though Ryanair may still appeal to the Supreme Court.

Ancillary revenue and in-flight service 
Twenty per cent of Ryanair's revenue is generated from ancillary revenue; that is, income from sources other than ticket fares. In 2009, ancillary revenue was at €598 million, compared to total revenue of €2,942 million.

Ryanair has been described by the consumer magazine Holiday Which? as being the worst offender for charging for optional extras. As part of the low-cost business model, the airline charges fees, which can be related to alternative services such as using airport check-in facilities instead of the online service fee and paying by credit card. It also charges for extra services like checked-in luggage and it offers food and drinks for purchase as part of a buy on board programme.

In 2009, Ryanair abolished airport check-in and replaced it with a fast bag drop for those passengers checking in bags. The option of checking in at the airport for €10 has been discontinued, and all passengers are required to check-in online and print their boarding pass. Passengers arriving at the airport without a pre-printed online check-in will have to pay €55/£45 for their boarding pass to be re-issued, whilst customers unable to check-in luggage online are asked to pay a fee which varies depending on where they are travelling to at the airport (as of June 2012). Ryanair faced criticism over the ambiguous nature of these changes.

No-frills 
New Ryanair aircraft have been delivered with non-reclining seats, no seat-back pockets, safety cards stuck on the back of the seats, and life jackets stowed overhead rather than under the seat. This allows the airline to save on aircraft costs and enables faster cleaning and security checks during short turnaround times. Ryanair reportedly wanted to order its aircraft without window shades, but the new aircraft do have them, as it is required by the regulations of the Irish Aviation Authority.

Other proposed measures to reduce frills further have included eliminating two toilets to add six more seats, redesigning the aircraft to allow standing passengers travelling in "vertical seats", charging passengers for using the toilet, charging extra for overweight passengers, and asking passengers to carry their checked-in luggage to the aircraft. While CEO Michael O'Leary initially claimed that charging passengers for toilets was "going to happen", he stated days later that it was "technically impossible and legally difficult" but "[made] for interesting and very cheap PR".

Customer service 
Ryanair has been criticised for many aspects of its customer service. The Economist wrote that Ryanair's "cavalier treatment of passengers" had given Ryanair "a deserved reputation for nastiness" and that the airline "has become a byword for appalling customer service ... and jeering rudeness towards anyone or anything that gets in its way". In January 2019, a survey conducted by Which? found that the airline was the UK's least-liked short-haul airline, for the sixth year running. Ryanair responded by saying that passenger numbers had risen 80% in the previous six years and this was a more accurate reflection of the airline's popularity than an "unrepresentative survey of just 8,000 people." In August 2019, Ryanair came bottom in an annual Which? survey rating the customer services of 100 popular UK brands.

In 2002, the High Court of Ireland in Dublin awarded Jane O'Keefe €67,500 damages and her costs after Ryanair reneged on a free travel prize she was awarded for being the airline's 1 millionth passenger.

The airline has come under heavy criticism for its poor treatment of disabled passengers. In 2002, it refused to provide wheelchairs for disabled passengers at London Stansted Airport, greatly angering disabled rights groups. The airline argued that this provision was the responsibility of the airport authority, stating that wheelchairs were provided by 80 of the 84 Ryanair destination airports, at that time. A court ruling in 2004 judged that the responsibility should be shared by the airline and the airport owners; Ryanair responded by adding a surcharge of £0.50 to all its flight prices. In July 2012, a 69-year-old woman, Frances Duff, who has a colostomy, was refused permission to bring her medical kit on board, despite having a letter from her doctor explaining the need for her to carry this with her, and was asked by Ryanair boarding staff to lift her shirt in front of fellow passengers, to prove that she had a colostomy bag. Duff had previously attempted to contact Ryanair on three occasions to inquire about its policy regarding travellers' colostomy bags, but each time no one answered the phone after half an hour. On 4 April 2011, Ryanair began adding a surcharge of €2 to its flights to cover the costs arising from compliance with EC Regulation 261/2004, which requires it to pay for meals and accommodation for passengers on delayed and cancelled flights.

Ryanair did not offer customers the possibility of contacting it by email or webform, only through a premium rate phone line, by fax or by post; however, it does now have a web form contact option. An early day motion in the British Parliament put forward in 2006 criticised Ryanair for this reason and called on the company to provide customers with a means to contact the company by email. Ryanair offers a basic rate telephone number for post-booking enquiries in the United Kingdom, which chose to omit the exemption for passenger transport services when enacting Article 21 of Directive 2011/83/EU on Consumer Rights under Regulation 41 of the Consumer Contracts (Information, Cancellation and Additional Payments) Regulations 2013.

Improved customer service and attracting families 
On 17 June 2014, Ryanair announced a new campaign to re-invent itself as a more family-friendly airline. Speaking at the company's 2014 AGM, chief executive Michael O'Leary said that the airline needed to "stop unnecessarily pissing people off". Ryanair said up to 20% of its 81 million customers were travelling as families, and it wanted to raise that figure. Kenny Jacobs, Ryanair's chief marketing officer, said: "Families are a big deal for us. It's a group of customers that we want to get closer to". As another step, the company launched LiveChat on its website to improve the quality of service and experience provided by the company. This change in their approach had an almost immediate positive effect on the company's finances.

Flight cancellations in September and October 2017 
Ryanair was subject to widespread criticism after it announced that it would be cancelling between 40 and 50 flights per day (about 2% of total daily flights) during September and October 2017. Flights were cancelled with very little notice, sometimes only hours before departure. Ryanair said that the cancellations aimed "to improve its system-wide punctuality" which had dropped significantly in the first two weeks of September, which the airline attributed to "ATC capacity delays and strikes, weather disruptions and the impact of increased holiday allocations to pilots and cabin crew". In subsequent statements, Ryanair acknowledged that it had "messed up" holiday schedules for pilots, including a change to the calendar year for how vacations were calculated.

In late December, a survey rated Ryanair and Vueling equally the worst in the world for customer service among short-haul carriers in the Which? survey. Ryanair responded, "[t]his survey of 9,000 Which? members is unrepresentative and worthless, during a year when Ryanair is the world’s largest international airline (129 m customers) and is also the world’s fastest-growing airline (up to 9 m customers in 2017). We have apologised for the deeply regretted flight cancellations and winter schedule changes, and the disruption they caused to less than 1% of our customers".

Language test 
In June 2022, Ryanair faced severe anger and backlash for making South Africans take a general knowledge test in the Afrikaans language before allowing them to board UK-bound flights, as a means to verify that their passports were genuine. South Africa has 11 official languages, of which Afrikaans is the 3rd most spoken, with a prevalence of 12%. A majority of the population cannot understand Afrikaans, and many refuse to speak it on principle, as it is regarded by some as the language of oppression during the Apartheid era. Michael O'Leary subsequently announced that the test was being dropped following outrage in South Africa.

Publicity

CO2 emissions 
In 2018, Ryanair became the first airline and the only non-coal-power plant to be among the 10 companies with the highest amount of CO2 emissions in the EU. That year, Ryanair had an emission equivalent of 9.9 megatonnes of CO2. Emissions had risen by 49% over five years. Environmentalists criticized the airline harshly and saw it as a sign of the lack of taxation of aviation. In 2020, Ryanair was criticised for releasing misleading advertisements through their claim they were "Europe's… Lowest Emissions Airline", using figures from an airline efficiency rating dating back to 2011.

Controversial advertising 

Ryanair's advertising and the antics of Michael O'Leary, such as deliberately courting controversy to generate free publicity for the airline, have led to several complaints to the Advertising Standards Authority (ASA) and occasionally court action being taken against the airline.

An example of this was the live BBC News interview on 27 February 2009 when Michael O'Leary, observing that it was "a quiet news day", commented that Ryanair was considering charging passengers £1 to use the toilet on its flights. The story subsequently made headlines in the media for several days and drew attention to Ryanair's announcement that it was removing check-in desks from airports and replacing them with online check-in. Eight days later O'Leary eventually admitted that it was a publicity stunt saying "It is not likely to happen, but it makes for interesting and very cheap PR". The concept of Ryanair charging for even this most essential of customer services was foreseen by the spoof news website "The Mardale Times" some five months previously, in its article "Ryanair announce new 'Pay-Per-Poo' service".

Ryanair often uses advertising to make direct comparisons and attack its competitors. One of its advertisements used a picture of the Manneken Pis, a famous Belgian statue of a urinating child, with the words: "Pissed off with Sabena's high fares? Low fares have arrived in Belgium." Sabena sued and the court ruled that the advertisements were misleading and offensive. Ryanair was ordered to discontinue the advertisements immediately or face fines. Ryanair was also obliged to publish an apology and publish the court decision on its website. Ryanair used the apologies for further advertising, primarily for further price comparisons.

Another provocative ad campaign headlined "Expensive BAstards!" compared Ryanair with British Airways. As with Sabena, British Airways disagreed with the accompanying price comparisons and brought legal action against Ryanair. However, in this case, the High Court sided with Ryanair and threw BA's case out ordering the BA to make a payment towards Ryanair's court costs. The judge ruled "The complaint amounts to this: that Ryanair exaggerated in suggesting BA is five times more expensive because BA is only three times more expensive."

In 2007, Ryanair used an advertisement for its new Belfast route which showed Sinn Féin's Martin McGuinness (Northern Ireland deputy First Minister and a former senior commander of the IRA) standing alongside party president Gerry Adams with a speech bubble which said "Ryanair fares are so low even the British Army flew home". Ulster Unionists reacted angrily to the advertisement, while the Advertising Standards Authority said it did not believe the ad would cause widespread offence.

An advertisement depicting a model dressed as a schoolgirl was accompanied by the words "Hottest back to school fares". Ryanair advertised two Scottish and one UK-wide newspaper. After receiving 13 complaints, the advertisement was widely reported by national newspapers. The Advertising Standards Authority (ASA) instructed the airline to withdraw the advertisement in the United Kingdom, saying that it "appeared to link teenage girls with sexually provocative behaviour and was irresponsible and likely to cause serious or widespread offence". Ryanair said that it would "not be withdrawing this ad" and would "not provide the ASA with any of the undertakings they seek", on the basis that it found it absurd that "a picture of a fully clothed model is now claimed to cause 'serious or widespread offence' when many of the UK's leading daily newspapers regularly run pictures of topless or partially dressed females without causing any serious or widespread offence".

In late 2020, the airline faced criticism over its "jab and go" advert.

Misleading advertising 
Although it usually does not serve the primary airports of major European cities, Ryanair has been criticised for placing the names of famous cities on distant secondary airports that were not built for tourist traffic and lacked transit links to the main city. Examples include "Paris Beauvais" ( north-northwest of Paris), "Brussels South" ( to the south of Brussels), "Milan Bergamo" ( from Milan), "Frankfurt Hahn" ( from Frankfurt and actually closer to the cities of Koblenz and Mainz), "Düsseldorf Weeze" ( from Düsseldorf and closer to Arnhem or Essen), "Glasgow Prestwick" ( from Glasgow), "Stockholm Skavsta" ( from Stockholm) and "Barcelona Reus" ( from Barcelona). Frommers has dubbed Ryanair the "ultimate bait-and-switch airline" for this deceptive practice.

Ryanair was ordered by the ASA to stop claiming that its flights from London to Brussels were faster than the rail connection Eurostar, because the claim was misleading, due to the required travel times to the airports mentioned. Ryanair stood by its claims, noting that the flight time is shorter than the train trip and that travel time is also required to reach Eurostar's stations.

In April 2008, Ryanair faced a probe by the UK Office of Fair Trading, after a string of complaints about its adverts. It was found to have breached advertising rules seven times in two years. ASA's director general Christopher Graham commented that formal referrals to the OFT were rare, the last occurring in 2005. He added that the ASA "would prefer to work with advertisers within the self-regulatory system rather than call in a statutory body, but Ryanair's approach has left us with no option". Ryanair countered with the claim that the ASA had "demonstrated a repeated lack of independence, impartiality and fairness".

In July 2009, Ryanair took several steps to "increase the clarity and transparency of its website and other advertising" after reaching an agreement with the OFT. The airline's website now includes a statement that "fares don't include optional fees/charges" and they now include a table of fees to make fare comparisons easier.

In July 2010, Ryanair once again found itself in controversy regarding alleged misleading advertising. Ryanair circulated advertisements in two newspapers offering £10 one-way fares to European destinations. Following a complaint from rival carrier EasyJet, the ASA ruled the offer was "likely to mislead". Ryanair did not comment on the claim but did hit back at EasyJet, claiming it cared about details in this regard but did not itself publicise its on-time statistics. EasyJet denied this.

In 2016, Ryanair stated that websites such as Opodo and CheapOair and their partners engaged in screenscraping and false advertising, and attempted to prevent them from showing Ryanair data.

In February 2020 the Advertising Standards Authority told Ryanair to provide adequate evidence to support environmental claims after the ASA banned adverts that claimed Ryanair was the lowest emissions airline in Europe for being misleading. Ryanair had claimed in the adverts that they had "the lowest carbon emissions of any major airline" and it was a "low CO2 emissions airline" based on Europes top 27 airlines. The ASA queried some figures and the definition of a "major airline" for the purposes of assessing . Complainants said the adverts were misleading and could not be substantiated.  In response to the ASA Ryanair cited data from Eurocontrol and airline efficiency rankings from Brighter Plant. However the ASA said that Ryanair had used an efficiency ranking from 2011 which was "of little value as substantiation for a comparison made in 2019". The ASA said that customers would interpret the adverts as saying that flying with Ryanair would mean they contributed fewer CO2 emissions to the earth atmosphere, which could not be proven. The ASA said that the adverts "ads must not appear again in their current forms" as claims in them could not be substantiated.

Criticism of surcharges 
In February 2011, a Ryanair passenger, Miro Garcia, brought a claim against Ryanair for unfair surcharges, claiming that the €40 (£30) surcharge on passengers who failed to print out a boarding card before arrival at the airport was unfair. Judge Barbara Cordoba, sitting in the Commercial Court in Barcelona, held that, under international air travel conventions, Ryanair can neither demand passengers turn up at the airport with their boarding pass, nor charge them €40 (£30) if they do not, and that the fines were abusive because aviation law obliges airlines to issue boarding passes. Judge Cordoba stated: "I declare abusively and, therefore, null, the clause in the contract by which Ryanair obliges the passenger to take a boarding pass to the airport. ... the customary practice over the years has been that the obligation to provide the boarding pass has always fallen on the airline". The judge ordered a refund for Mr Garcia and said the fact the company was a low-cost carrier did "not allow it to alter its basic contractual obligations". Ryanair appealed the decision and the Appeals Court in Spain overturned the ruling in November 2011, holding that the surcharge complies with international law.

In December 2011, Ryanair announced that it would fight against the UK Treasury's plan to ban what Which? magazine called "rip-off" charges made when customers paid by credit card. EU legislation has already been drafted against surcharges for methods of payment.

Fuel incidents 
On 26 July 2012, three Ryanair aircraft inbound to Madrid–Barajas Airport diverted to Valencia Airport due to severe thunderstorms in the Madrid area. All three aircraft declared an emergency (Mayday) when the calculated usable fuel on landing at Valencia Airport was less than the final reserve (30 minutes of flight) after having been held in the air for 50 to 69 minutes. The Irish Aviation Authority investigated the incidents and came to several conclusions, including:

 "The aircraft in all three cases departed for Madrid with fuel over Flight Plan requirements";
 "The Crew diverted to Valencia with fuel more than the minimum diversion fuel depicted on the Flight Plan";
 "Diverting with fuel close to minimum diversion fuel in the circumstances presented on the evening in question was likely to present challenges for the crew. Initial holding was to the Southwest of Madrid which increased the diversion time to the alternate";
 "The Crew declared an Emergency by EU-OPS when the calculated usable fuel for landing at Valencia was less than final reserve";
 "The Met conditions in Madrid were more significant than anticipated by the Crew when reviewing the Met Forecast. Consequently, the additional fuel carried was influenced by the forecast";
 "Operations into a busy airport such as Madrid in Thunderstorm conditions with the associated traffic levels can add significant delays to all traffic";
 "Air Traffic Control in Valencia was under significant pressure with the number of diversions arriving in their airspace."

The Irish Aviation Authority made several recommendations, including that Ryanair should "review [its] fuel policy and consider issuing guidance to Crew concerning fuel when operating into busy airports with mixed aircraft operators and types, particularly in poor weather conditions when diversions are likely." The IAA also recommended that the Spanish Aviation Safety and Security Agency "review delays into Madrid to consider if additional fuel should be recommended or required to be carried in normal operations, particularly where the southerly Runways are in operation."

Among the causes of the incident, the Civil Aviation Accident and Incident Investigation Commission concluded that "the company's fuel savings policy, though it complies with the minimum legal requirements, tends to minimise the amount of fuel with which its aircraft operate and leaves none for contingencies below the legal minimums. This contributed to the amount of fuel used being improperly planned and to the amount of fuel onboard dropping below the required final fuel reserve."

In an interview with the Dutch investigative journalism programme KRO Reporter, four anonymous Ryanair pilots claimed they were being pressured to carry as little fuel as possible on board to cut costs. Ryanair and its CEO Michael O'Leary denied the allegations and sued KRO. On 16 April 2014, the Dutch Court decided that KRO had provided sufficient evidence in two television episodes of Mayday, Mayday broadcast in 2012 and 2013 to back the claims in respect of Ryanair's fuel policy and "fear culture". It also found that Ryanair had been given a right to reply in response to the claims. The broadcast of the programmes was found to be in the public interest. Ryanair was ordered to pay the legal costs of the case.

Handling of the 2020 COVID-19 pandemic 
Starting in late March 2020, in response to flight cancellations due to travel restrictions set by governments due to COVID-19, Ryanair was forced to cancel flights. This resulted in many of their staff being placed on furlough, with pay being cut by up to 50% for some employees placed on the Irish Temporary Wage Subsidy Scheme (TWSS). 

The handling of refunds from Ryanair has caused a surge in complaints to the Commission for Aviation Regulation (CAR), with customers claiming that they have been refused a refund for the flight cancellation. Many organisations have taken a stance against the aviation industry via actions or declarations in the press. The Italian civil aviation authority ENAC has threatened a ban of Ryanair due to alleged violation of local COVID-19 regulations.

The Ryanair chief executive Michael O'Leary said its planes would not fly if the airline was required to leave its middle seats empty to comply with in-flight social distancing rules. He said blocking the space between seats was "idiotic" and would have no beneficial effect.

Competitors 
Ryanair has several low-cost competitors. In 2004, approximately 60 new low-cost airlines were formed. Although traditionally a full-service airline, Aer Lingus moved to a low-fares strategy from 2002, leading to a much more intense competition with Ryanair on Irish routes. Ryanair is a member of Airlines for Europe, having formerly been a member of the defunct European Low Fares Airline Association.

Airlines that attempt to compete directly with Ryanair are treated competitively, with Ryanair being accused by some of reducing fares to significantly undercut its competitors. In response to MyTravelLite, which started to compete with Ryanair on Birmingham to Dublin route in 2003, Ryanair set up competing flights on some of MyTravelLite's routes until it pulled out. Go was another airline that attempted to offer services from Ryanair's base in Dublin to Glasgow and Edinburgh in Scotland. A fierce battle ensued, which ended with Go withdrawing its service from Dublin.

In September 2004, Ryanair's biggest competitor, EasyJet, announced routes to Ireland for the first time, beginning with the Cork to London Gatwick route. Until then, EasyJet had never competed directly with Ryanair on its home ground. EasyJet later withdrew its Gatwick-Cork, Gatwick-Shannon, Gatwick-Knock and Luton-Shannon routes.

In 2012, Ryanair also responded to the decision of another low-cost carrier, Wizz Air that planned to move its flight operations from Warsaw Chopin Airport in Poland to the new low-cost Warsaw Modlin Airport in Nowy Dwór Mazowiecki. Ryanair had previously operated the route to Dublin from Warsaw but withdrew, claiming that the fees at Warsaw's main airport were too high. When Wizz Air began operations from Modlin Airport, Ryanair began several new routes from the same airport, most of which were identical to routes offered by Wizz Air.

In 2008, Ryanair asked the Irish High Court to investigate why it had been refused permission to fly from Knock to Dublin. This route was won by CityJet, which could not operate the service. The runner-up, Aer Arann, was then allowed to start flights, a move Ryanair criticises as the basis of not initiating an additional tender process was unlawful.

DFDS Seaways cited competition from low-cost air services, especially Ryanair, which now flies to Edinburgh Airport and London Stansted Airport from Göteborg Landvetter Airport, as the reason for scrapping the Newcastle–Gothenburg ferry service in October 2006. It was the only dedicated passenger ferry service between Sweden and the United Kingdom and had been running under various operators since the 19th century.

Destinations 

Ryanair's largest base is at London-Stansted with 44 aircraft, followed by its home base at Dublin Airport. Ryanair operates from 84 bases connecting 35 countries across Europe and North Africa, some of which only base a single aircraft. Several non-base airports serve more flights and/or destinations than certain base airports.

Ryanair traditionally prefers to fly to smaller or secondary airports usually outside major cities to help the company benefit from lower landing fees and quick turn-around times to reduce costs. In some cases, secondary airports are not distant from the city they serve, and can be closer than the city's major airport; this is the case at Rome Ciampino Airport.

Ryanair does still serve several major airports, including Amsterdam Schiphol, Athens, Barcelona El Prat, Brussels, Budapest, Copenhagen, Dublin, Lisbon, London-Gatwick, Madrid Barajas, Marseille, Oslo-Gardermoen and Rome-Fiumicino. Some of these cities do not have a viable secondary airport that Ryanair could use as an alternative. More recently, Ryanair has grown more at primary airports as it looks to attract more business passengers. In the summer of 2014, the airline opened bases in Athens, Lisbon and the primary airports of Brussels and Rome for the first time.

Ryanair flies in a point to-point model rather than the more traditional airline hub and spoke model where the passengers have to change aircraft in transit at a major airport, usually being able to reach more destinations this way. In April 2017 Ryanair added connecting flights to its portfolio, starting with a new transfer hub in Rome Fiumicino Airport (FCO). Ryanair has 50 European bases. Despite it being an Irish airline, it also has a significant presence in France, Germany, Italy, Poland, Spain, the United Kingdom as well as many other European countries. Currently, its biggest country market is Italy, with fourteen bases and nine non-base airports.

Ryanair's largest competitor is EasyJet which has a far greater focus on larger or primary airports such as Amsterdam and Paris-Charles de Gaulle, heavily targeting business passengers. Ryanair also serves sun and beach destinations with bases in Sicily, the Canary Islands, Cyprus, the Greek Islands and Malta among others. In August 2014, the airline unveiled ambitious plans to establish a major hub in Israel to service a broad range of European routes. In December 2014 Ryanair announced plans to open its 72nd base in 2015 in the Azores. In February 2018, due to the Scottish Government not abolishing or reducing Air Passenger Duty (APD), Ryanair announced that it would cut many flights out of Glasgow Airport resulting in the airline closing its base there. The only routes out of Glasgow by the end of October were Dublin, Kraków and Wroclaw, with the rest being suspended permanently. This resulted in the loss of 300 members of airport staff. In April 2019, the airline reinstated four of its routes; to Alicante, Brussels, Málaga and Warsaw. In 2022, Ryanair announced that it would close its base at Frankfurt Airport in a row over fees, with the loss of 17 routes. The five aircraft based there are to be based in other locations throughout Europe.

Choosing destinations 
When Ryanair negotiates with airport operators, it demands very low landing and handling fees, as well as financial assistance with marketing and promotional campaigns. In subsequent contract renewal negotiations, the airline has been reported to play airports against each other, threatening to withdraw services and deploy the aircraft elsewhere, if the airport does not make further concessions. According to Michael O'Leary's biography, A Life in Full Flight, Ryanair's growing popularity and also growing bargaining power, with both airports and aircraft manufacturers, has resulted in the airline being less concerned about a market research/demographics approach to route selection to one based more on experimentation. This means it is more likely to fly its aircraft between the lowest-cost airports in anticipation that its presence alone on that route will be sufficient to create a demand which previously may not have existed, either in whole or in part.

In April 2006, a failure to reach an agreement on a new commercial contract resulted in Ryanair announcing that it would withdraw service on the Dublin–Cardiff route at short notice. The airport management rebutted Ryanair's assertion that airport charges were unreasonably high, claiming that the Cardiff charges were already below Ryanair's average and claimed that Ryanair had recently adopted the same negotiating approach with Cork Airport and London Stansted Airport. In 2009, Ryanair was reported to have adopted 'harsh' negotiating with Shannon Airport, threatening to close 75% of its operations there from April 2010. Ryanair was forced to give up its Rome Ciampino–Alghero route, after the route was allocated to Air One, as a public service obligation (PSO) route. The European Commission is investigating the actions of the Italian Government in assigning PSO routes and thus restricting competition. In 2016 Ryanair withdrew over half of its flights from Rygge airport in Norway, after which the airport decided to close down totally, as they were privately owned and would make a loss on the low traffic volume.

In some cases (an increasing number as the years pass), Ryanair has decided to use large airports where they are not dominant and to pay the normal fees there. Examples include Barcelona, Oslo, Copenhagen and Manchester, which the carrier increased flights in 2021.

Fleet

Current group fleet 
, the Ryanair Group fleet consists of the following aircraft:

Former fleet 
Ryanair has operated the following types of aircraft in the past:

Fleet development 
Following the 2019 grounding of all 737 MAX aircraft, Ryanair initially reaffirmed its confidence in the aircraft and indicated that it would be ready to place a new order once it had returned to service; it would seek a reduced price instead of cash compensation. In July that year, it warned that some of its bases would be subject to short-term closures in 2020, due to the shortfall in MAX deliveries, and pointed out that the MAX 200 version it has ordered will require separate certification expected to take a further two months after the MAX returns to service. In the same month, O'Leary expressed concerns and frustration with the certification delays and revealed that, in parallel with discussions with Boeing regarding a potential order for new aircraft to be delivered from 2023, he was also talking to Airbus which was offering very aggressive pricing.

As of March 2018, the average age of the Ryanair fleet was around 6.5 years, roughly 2 years older than some of the competition. When Boeing builds an aircraft for Ryanair, it is allocated the customer code AS, which appears in its aircraft designation as an infix, such as 737-8AS.

Ryanair's fleet reached 200 aircraft for the first time on 5 September 2009. All aircraft in the Ryanair fleet have been retrofitted with performance-enhancing winglets and the more recent deliveries have them fitted as standard.

The company also owns three Learjet 45 business jets, based at London Stansted Airport and Bergamo Airport but registered in the Isle of Man, which are mainly used for the quick transportation of maintenance personnel and small aircraft parts around the network.

On 13 March 2013, Ryanair signed an order for 175 new Boeing 737-800s. In the press conference announcing the order, Michael O'Leary said Ryanair was still evaluating the possibility of the Boeing 737 MAX and stated its huge order in March was for the Boeing 737 Next Generation rather than the 737 MAX as it needed aircraft before the 737 MAX would enter service.

On 30 April 2014, Ryanair confirmed that it had ordered five more aircraft to add to its fleet, four of them to be delivered in 2015 and the last one to be delivered in February 2016, to bring the number of aircraft on order to 180.

In the Summer of 2014, Ryanair contracted AirExplore to operate some of their summer flights between London Stansted and Dublin airport.

Ryanair also showed interest in other aircraft, including the Comac C919, when it signed a design agreement with Comac in 2011 to help produce a rival jet to Boeing's offerings. At the Paris Airshow in 2013, Michael O'Leary stated that Comac could build a larger version of the C919 aircraft that would hold up to 200 passengers.

On 8 September 2014, Ryanair committed to ordering 100 new Boeing 737 MAX 8s (plus options for an additional 100) for delivery in 2019.

On 1 December 2014, the airline finalised its order for up to 200 Boeing 737 MAX 200s, a version of the 737 MAX 8 for low-cost airlines, named after the fact that they can carry 200 passengers. The order includes 100 firm and 100 purchase rights. This makes Ryanair the launch customer of the Boeing 737 MAX 200.

After delays due to the grounding of the 737 MAX, the first 737 MAX 8-200 was finally delivered to Ryanair on 16 June 2021. Twelve deliveries were expected for the summer 2021 season (6 for Ryanair and 6 for Malta Air) and a further 50 by summer 2022.

In July 2021, it was announced that Ryanair had already handed back all of its leased B737s, which were replaced by incoming B737 MAX 8-200 aircraft. The carrier expects to sell more of its older aircraft in the future.

In November 2022 the company announced it would have 124 Boeing 737 MAX 200 by summer 2023, reducing the number of unfulfilled orders to 86 aircraft.

In January 2023, the first Ryanair 737-800 to be retrofitted with split scimitar winglets entered service. The winglets reduce fuel burn by 1.5% and are to be fitted to all existing -800 aircraft in the Ryanair fleet.

On 30 January 2023, Ryanair Holdings CFO Neil Sorahan said that the A320ceo leases are extended to 2028.

Accidents and incidents 

 On 10 November 2008, Ryanair Flight 4102, from Frankfurt–Hahn Airport, suffered undercarriage damage in an emergency landing at Rome–Ciampino Airport, after experiencing bird strikes, which damaged both engines on approach. There were six crew members and 166 passengers on board. Two crew members and eight passengers were taken to hospital with minor injuries. The port undercarriage of the Boeing 737-800 collapsed, leaving the aircraft stranded on the runway and closing the airport for over 35 hours. As well as damage to the engines and undercarriage, the rear fuselage was also damaged by contact with the runway. The aircraft involved was damaged beyond repair and was scrapped. The final report of the accident, investigated by ANSV (National Flight Safety Agency) was released on 20 December 2018, more than 10 years after the accident and only in Italian. An English translation was provided by Aviation Accident Database.
According to the airline, its pilots were notified by Belarusian authorities of "a potential security threat on board" and told to land the plane in Minsk. In Minsk, Belarusian journalist and opposition activist Raman Pratasevich and his girlfriend were removed from the plane and arrested. Although the plane was closer to Vilnius, Belarusian president Alexander Lukashenko, according to his press service, personally ordered the flight to be redirected to Minsk and sent Belarusian Air Force MiG-29 fighter aircraft to escort it. Belarusian opposition leader Sviatlana Tsikhanouskaya called for an ICAO investigation of the incident.

See also 
 List of airlines
 List of companies of Ireland
 List of low-cost airlines
 Ryanair UK

Notes

References

Further reading

External links 

 

 
 Airlines established in 1984
 Airlines for Europe
 Airlines of the Republic of Ireland
 Companies based in Swords, Dublin
 Companies listed on Euronext Dublin
 Companies listed on the Nasdaq
 European Low Fares Airline Association
 Irish brands
 Irish companies established in 1984
 Low-cost carriers